Sancerrois is a French natural region around Sancerre, Centre-Val de Loire.

The region is identified by its hills, vignoble and the crottin de Chavignol.

Geography
It is considered to lie between the Pays-Fort natural region and la Loire ; it peaks at 431 m at the signal d'Humbligny on la Motte d'Humbigny.

Patrimoine
 the château de Boucard at Le Noyer

Geography of Cher (department)